Alexander John Robertson (4 January 1887 – 6 August 1915), a geologist and mining engineer, was an Australian rules footballer who played for the University Football Club in the Victorian Football League (VFL) in 1910.

He served in the First AIF, and was killed in action at  Gallipoli, Ottoman Turkey.

Family  
The son of James Lang Robertson (1858-1929), M.A., and Annie Robertson (1859-1944), née McArthur, Alexander John Robertson was born at Bundalaguah, near Sale, in Gippsland, Victoria, on 4 January 1887, where his father was the headmaster of the local State School.

He married Violet Ann "Dear Wah" Chapman (1885-1917) in 1911. Violet, who had left for England not long after Robertson's death, and who had served for almost two years with the Voluntary Aid Detachment at Coulter Hospital, in London, and had just qualified to serve in France as an ambulance driver, was killed in a riding accident, in London's Hyde Park, on 30 November 1917.

Education 
He was educated at St. Andrew's College, Bendigo, where he was dux of the school, and at the University of Melbourne. He was a resident of Ormond College.

While at the university, in addition to his courses in Science and Mining Engineering, he rowed, played cricket, played football, and competed in the long jump for Ormond College;  and, as well, represented the university at both rowing, and at football.

Awards
 1908: Full blue for football.
 1909: Bachelor of Science (B.Sc.).
 1909: Final Honor Scholarship in Geology, Palæontology, and Mineralogy.
 1909: Professor Kernot Research Scholarship in Geology.
 1912: Master of Science (M.Sc.).

Football 
He was part of the Melbourne University team that played in the annual match against Adelaide University on 19 August 1908.

Playing for the University in the Metropolitan Junior Football Association (MJFA), he made his debut for the University's VFL team, playing on the half-back flank, against Richmond on 8 May 1909. He played 10 senior matches, and was one of the best University players in his last match, the season's final round, in the draw against Fitzroy, that was played in a quagmire at the Brunswick Street Oval on 4 September 1909.

His studies at university and his employment in Queensland prevented him from playing for the University's VFL team in 1910.

Western Australia 
Having spent twelve months as a lecturer in science and mining at the Brisbane Technical College, he moved to Western Australia to work as an assistant mineralogist and surveyor with the Geological Survey of West Australia in 1911 — and, later, still with the Geological Survey of West Australia, he also assumed the duties of a chemist and analyst.

He was admitted as an inaugural member of the Convocation of the University of Western Australia in 1913.

Military 
He enlisted in the First AIF on 10 May 1915, and served overseas in Egypt and at Gallipoli.

Death 
He was killed in action at Gallipoli on 6 August 1915.
Lieutenant Alexander John Robertson … had joined the 11th Battalion only two days before his death, and was engaged in holding a trench which had been captured from the Turks.The latter made a counter attack in force, and Lieutenant Robertson, to inspire confidence in the men under his command, sprang into a recess, and raising his head and shoulders above the parapet, fired his revolver into the foremost of the enemy, and continued to do so until he was shot.His commanding officer says, "He died a gallant Australian soldier."

See also
 List of Victorian Football League players who died in active service

Footnotes

References
 "Good Luck, Boys!" (The Officers), The (Perth) Daily News, (Thursday, 15 June 19150, p.7.
 Australian Casualties: 98th List Issued: Killed in Action: Western Australia, The Argus, (Tuesday, 26 October 1915), p.5.
 The Late Lieutenant A. J. Robertson, The West Australian, (Saturday, 30 October 1915), p.7.
 World War One Service Record: Second Lieutenant Alexander John Robertson, National Archives of Australia.
 Roll of Honour: Second Lieutenant Alexander John Robertson, Australian War Memorial.
 WWI Pictorial Honour Roll of Victorians: Robertson, Alexander John.
 Australian Soldiers who have Fallen at the Dardanelles (No.25. Lieut. A.J. Robertson, W.A.), The Australasian, (Saturday, 27 November 1915), p.26.
 Holmesby, Russell & Main, Jim (2007). The Encyclopedia of AFL Footballers. 7th ed., Melbourne: Bas Publishing.

External links 
 

1887 births
1915 deaths
Australian rules footballers from Victoria (Australia)
University Football Club players
Australian military personnel killed in World War I
People from Sale, Victoria
University of Melbourne alumni sportspeople